Juan. A Paradere is a city with a train station in Buenos Aires Province, Argentina near La Plata and La Pampa Province.

References 

Populated places in Buenos Aires Province